Alexander Rose (1781 – 1860) of Edinburgh was a wood and ivory turner, following in the footsteps of his father, John, who came from Cromarty. He developed an interest in minerals and began a mineral collection, becoming a dealer in minerals. He later became a lecturer in geology and mineralogy at Queen's College, Edinburgh and was eventually nominated as a Fellow of the Royal Scottish Academy.

He was educated at the Royal High School and in 1816, he married Isabella Boyne. They had three sons and six daughters.

In 1834, eleven of his students set up the Edinburgh Geological Society, of which Rose became President for eleven years until 1846.

He retired from active work in 1856 and died four years later.

Recently, he has come to fame again as the notorious 'Alex the Geologist' in the math problem books written by Phillips Exeter Academy.  The series of problems, featured throughout all the math levels, has Alex located in the desert, a certain distance from a road and a certain distance from his camp.  Generally, the goal is to calculate the fastest route back to his camp.

Sources
Land, David (1999), Alexander Rose and the Society's furniture and silver, The Edinburgh Geologist, no 32, pp 30–36.
Monro, Stuart (1981), Reflections on Alexander Rose, The Edinburgh Geologist, no 10, pp 2–4.

1781 births
1860 deaths
Scientists from Edinburgh
People educated at the Royal High School, Edinburgh
Academics from Edinburgh
Scottish mineralogists